Semenyih Dam is a dam in Hulu Langat District, Selangor, Malaysia. Built in 1985, the dam, with the lovely lake surrounded by green forested hills, provides one of the most breathtaking sights in the country. It also supplies a major portion of drinking water to the Klang Valley population. Semenyih Dam also has become popular with angling enthusiasts, especially on weekends.

Station Custodian 	Jabatan Parit dan Saliran (Drainage & Irrigation Dept)
Type                   Earthfill
Station Type 	        Secondary/Auto
Location               River sub-basin
Grid Reference 	VK732733
Latitude (Deg/Min/Sec) 03 05 08
Longitude (Deg/Min/Sec)101 53 21
Height                 49m
Date Equipment Inst    Manual - 08/1990
Auto -                 08/1990
Operation Period 	Start Date
Current Equipment 	S8 & HL
Status 	        In Operation

See also
1998 Klang Valley water crisis

1985 establishments in Malaysia
Dams in Selangor
Dams completed in 1985
Hulu Langat District